Clay Straus Jenkinson (born February 4, 1955 in Dickinson, North Dakota) is an American humanities scholar, author and educator. He is currently the director of The Dakota Institute, where he co-hosts public radio's The Thomas Jefferson Hour, and creates documentary films, symposia, and literary projects. He lectures at Dickinson State University and Bismarck State College.

Life
Jenkinson was born in Dickinson, in southwestern North Dakota; his father was a banker and his mother a schoolteacher.  Although the family moved quite often when he and his sister were children, Jenkinson grew up mostly in Dickinson.  He graduated from Dickinson High School in 1973 and then attended Vanderbilt University and the University of Minnesota.  He graduated in 1977 with a degree in English, and was then a Rhodes scholar at Oxford.

In 2005 at the age of 50 Jenkinson returned to North Dakota as a permanent resident; he resides in Bismarck.  He is currently the Director of The Dakota Institute through The Lewis & Clark Fort Mandan Foundation, Chief Consultant to The Theodore Roosevelt Center through Dickinson State University, and a Distinguished Humanities Scholar at Bismarck State College. He is James Marsh Professor-at-Large at the University of Vermont.

Jenkinson has one child, Catherine Missouri Walker Jenkinson, from his marriage to Etta L. Walker (they married on 16 March 1986 and divorced in 1997). His daughter was named after the Little Missouri River.

Portrayal of Jefferson
Jenkinson first achieved fame for his portrayal (first-person historical interpretation) of Thomas Jefferson. On April 11, 1994, he was the first public humanities scholar to present a program at a White House-sponsored event when he presented Thomas Jefferson for a gathering hosted by President and Mrs. Clinton. As co-founder of the modern Chautauqua movement, Jenkinson has also portrayed Sir Francis Bacon, Jonathan Swift, J. Robert Oppenheimer, John Wesley Powell, Jean-Jacques Rousseau, Theodore Roosevelt, and Meriwether Lewis.

Jenkinson's public portrayals take the form of lengthy monologues followed by Q & A sessions as the character (in costume) featured for that performance. At the end of his performances, he steps out of character and answers questions as himself. Another performance variation is represented by his nationally syndicated radio show, The Thomas Jefferson Hour:
"While staying resolutely in character, Mr. Jenkinson permits Jefferson to answer audience questions on a broad range of historical subjects and comment carefully on contemporary social and political topics."

On November 15, 2006, Clay appeared as Jefferson on The Colbert Report with two other Jefferson impersonators, Bill Barker and Steven Edenbo.

Awards
In 1989, Jenkinson became one of the first winners of the nation's highest award in the humanities, the Charles Frankel Prize, awarded by President George H.W. Bush for his achievements.  The National Endowment for the Humanities once described Jenkinson as "A leader in the revival of Chautauqua, a forum for public discussion about the ideas and lives of key figures in American history." He has been awarded  the Robert J. Laxalt Writer of the Year Award from University of Nevada-Reno and is a Rhodes scholar and Danforth Scholar. Jenkinson was a senior fellow for the Center for Digital Government, based in California, and was scholar-in-residence at Lewis & Clark College in Portland, Oregon from 2002–2006, and Roosevelt scholar-in-residence at Dickinson State University from 2005-2008. In 2004, Jenkinson was inducted into the Scandinavian-American Hall of Fame, a signature event of Norsk Høstfest.

Selected publications

Books
The Character of Meriwether Lewis: Explorer in the Wilderness 
Message on the Wind: A Spiritual Odyssey on the Northern Plains 
Becoming Jefferson's People: Re-Inventing the American Republic in the Twenty-First Century 
Theodore Roosevelt in the Dakota Badlands: An Historical Guide
A Free and Hardy Life: Theodore Roosevelt's Sojourn in the American West
A Vast and Open Plain: The Writings of the Lewis and Clark Expedition in North Dakota, 1804-1806
For the Love of North Dakota and Other Essays: Sundays with Clay in the Bismarck Tribune
The Bill Of Rights And Beyond Thomas Jefferson's Perspective
Lewis and Clark in Iowa
The Language of Cottonwoods: Essays on the Future of North Dakota

Documentaries
When the Landscape is Quiet again: the Legacy of Art Link

References

External links 
Jefferson Hour.com - official site
Dakota Sky Education.com - Jenkinson's informational website
Prairie Public.org - Clay Jenkinson at 50 - 04-Feb-2005
Dickinson State University - faculty directory

1955 births
Living people
Historians of the United States
21st-century American historians
21st-century American male writers
American Rhodes Scholars
Alumni of University College, Oxford
People from Minot, North Dakota
Lewis & Clark College faculty
National Humanities Medal recipients
People from Dickinson, North Dakota
American male non-fiction writers